Nazar Ke Samne is a 1995 Indian action film directed by Jagdish A. Sharma. It stars Akshay Kumar, Kiran Kumar, Mukesh Khanna, Dalip Tahil and Farheen in pivotal role.

Plot
Umesh, a photographer is arrested for the murder of his newspaper editor. The fact that they had an altercation earlier and that he was found at the murder scene with the murder weapon (a knife) in his hands lead to his arrest. However, in court the lawyer- Sahni, almost wins the case for Umesh. But Jai, an eyewitness, enters and his testimony results in a sentence to be hanged until death for Umesh. Jai Kumar is a fraud who can be paid to become an eyewitness. Sarita- Umesh's sister realises her brother's predicament and that Jai is a liar. She makes Jai realise how his lies can destroy families. He has a change of heart, falls in love with Sarita and promises to save Umesh. However, the court rejects Sahni's request to re-open the case. They come across a photograph which was taken accidentally at the murder scene. However, only the murderer's shoes are seen. Jai searches for the man who had paid him to lie and to find the owner of the shoes. It turns out that the lawyer is not such a nice man after all. He murdered the editor who was blackmailing him. Now as Jai is trying to find him, he has to make sure there is no proof or witnesses to prove he is the murderer. Who succeeds and how is the rest of the story.

Cast
 Akshay Kumar as Jai Kumar
 Farheen as Sarita
 Ashok Saraf as Mamu
 Ekta Sohini as Chamia
 Mukesh Khanna as Badshah Khan Sharbatwala
 Kiran Kumar as Advocate Sangram Singh Sahni
 Dalip Tahil as Mac
 Shiva Rindani as Jimmy
 Dharmesh Tiwari as Umesh

Soundtrack

References

External links
 

1994 films
1990s Hindi-language films
Indian action drama films